Nguyễn Văn Bảy (1936 – September 22, 2019), was a Vietnamese jet fighter ace for the Vietnam People's Air Force (North Vietnamese Air Force) during the Vietnam War. Piloting a MiG-17F while assigned to the 923rd Fighter Regiment, Bay claimed 7 aerial combat victories while engaged against aircraft of the USAF and USN: 2 F-8s, 1 F-4B, 1 A-4C and 1 F-105D. Of the 7 claimed victories, 5 are acknowledged by American documents. Of 16 VPAF (North Vietnamese) aces during Vietnam War, only Bay, Luu Huy Chao, and Le Hai solely flew MiG-17s.

Background
Nguyen Van Bay was born in 1937 in a place nowadays Sa Đéc City, Đồng Tháp Province. He was the seventh of 11 children. At the age of 16, Bay went North to join the army to fight against the French during the First Indochina War (aka the French Indochina War). When the war ended in 1954, Vietnam was temporarily divided into two states along the 17th Parallel; North Vietnam and South Vietnam. Bay chose to stay in the North, at which time he lost all contact with his family.

In 1962, Bay volunteered for flight training and was among the first pilot trainees sent to train in the People's Republic of China. As he told it, he "went from the bicycle to the airplane with no stop in between." He learned to drive a car only long after he began flight training.
 Bay and the other trainees started with Yak-18s, then moved on to MiG-15s, finally graduating to the MiG-17s. Similar to U.S. pilots, the North Vietnamese usually flew 200 hours in training before going into combat. Bay's training took four years, successfully completing his training in January 1966.

Vietnam People's Air force
Bay began his combat aviation career with the 910th Air Training Regiment in Vietnam in 1959, and started MiG-17 training in China in the early 1960s. Bay returned to Vietnam for combat duty with the 921st Fighter Regiment, but scored his first aerial victory with the 923rd Fighter Regiment in April 1966 during the early part of the U.S.-involved Vietnam War; Bay was awarded the coveted Hero of the Vietnamese People's Armed Forces medal on 1 January 1967.

Note: The following aerial engagements do not match with the number of aircraft he shot down, according to the United States Air Force. The aircraft he shot down as claimed by the USAF are 2 F-8s, 1 F-4B, 1 A-4C and 1 F-105D. In addition, the following engagements suggest that he shot down 8 aircraft even though he is credited with 7. Nevertheless, the following aerial-combat victories listed, at the very least, include all the kills acknowledged and credited to Nguyễn Văn Bảy by the VPAF:

October 6, 1965
Bay had his first engagement when he was attacked by an F-4 Phantom. The F-4 fired an AIM-7D missile 
that detonated off his left wing. His MiG-17 then pitched down and started vibrating. Bay managed to land safely at Noi Bai airfield, just north of Hanoi. He later stated, "I felt like a light boxer who confidently walked up to the ring and tried to knock out the super heavy boxers. It was not a single fight but dozens of dogfights. We were outnumbered four or five to one. Our thoughts were on survival, nothing more."

April 26, 1966
USAF F-4C Phantom IIs participated in a strike along Route 10 at Bac Son-Binh Gia, and a flight of four MiG-17s that included pilot Nguyen Van Bay were directed by North Vietnamese ground control intercept radar (GCI) to fly at 2,500 meters and 15 km south of Bac Son-Binh Gia; due to the constant shifting of direction of flight by the U.S. aircraft, the MiG-17 pilots decided engaged the American raiders head-on, and in the ensuing melee, Luu Huy Chao claimed a Phantom shot-down, while Nguyen Van Bay scored hits on another Phantom, damaging it for certain, but couldn't confirm it as a kill.

April 29, 1966
On 29 April 1966, North Vietnamese GCI directed the 923rd Fighter Regiment MiGs into two separate battles against USAF and USN aircraft. A pilot of one flight of MiG-17s from the 923rd regiment, Bui Dinh Kinh claimed the downing of a USAF A-1E Skyraider piloted by Col. Leo "Sid" Boston; although some sources may have misidentified the loss as a USN A-4E Skyhawk piloted by navy Captain (same rank as air force Colonel) L.S. Boston. In the other interception flight of the 923rd regiment MiG-17s that day, Nguyen Van Bay intercepted USAF F-105s and F-4s, shooting down the F-105D Thunderchief piloted by Lt. Donald W. Bruch of the 333rd TFS, just north of Hanoi, although the US-side claims this loss was due to AAA; Lt. Bruch according to witnesses, was not seen to eject from his stricken aircraft, and was declared KIA on 4 May 1966.

June 21, 1966
Bay and three other MiG-17s were sent to engage an RF-8A (reconnaissance variant) and its escorting F-8s. Despite two Migs being destroyed by the F-8s, Bay managed to down one F-8 piloted by Cole Black.
While Bay and the other MiG-17s were engaging the F-8s, the lead Mig-17, piloted by Phan Thanh Trung, shot down the RF-8A.

June 29, 1966
Bay and three other MiG-17s were sent to engage F-105s heading for the fuel depots in Hanoi. With the help of fellow pilot Phan Van Tuc, catching the lead F-105 off-guard, Bay shot it down. The F-105D that was downed in this engagement between Nguyen and Phan, was piloted by Capt. M.N. Jones, who then spent 2,420 days at the prison camp often referred to as the "Hanoi Hilton", although as typical of American sources, the counter-claim is that Jones was shot down due to "fire from rockets and anti-aircraft cannons".

September 5, 1966
Le Thanh Chon, the senior control officer at Gia Lam airfield, vectored Bay and his wing-man Vo Van Man to an unknown target in the South. As they headed south, Bay observed a flight of A-4 Skyhawks flying away from a smoking bridge. To his front, he observed two F-8 Crusaders approaching the A-4s from the right of where he was heading. Bay and his wingman jettisoned their drop tanks in preparation for battle. The F-8s took position behind the A-4s to escort them from the bridge. Chon, watching the events on radar ordered Bay to fly forward, Bay was then given permission to engage, at which time he attacked the trailing F-8, adjusting his fire on the tracers.  As his rounds struck near the canopy of the F-8, the plane began coming apart, Crusader pieces filled the air as Bay's MiG started to fly through them. Avoiding the danger, he pulled away, at the same time observing the pilot ejecting from his aircraft.  The engagement lasted approximately 45 seconds, and when he landed, Plexiglas from the F-8 was found in his engine intake. The American F-8 pilot was captured shortly after ejecting, and turned out to be Wilfred K. Abbott, serving in the squadron VF-111, carrier .

September 16, 1966
In the early afternoon at Gia Lam airfield, Bay was flying in the number three position in a flight of four, when they were directed to engage US aircraft. Bay was the first to observe a flight of F-4s, and asked his flight leader, Ho Van Quy, for permission to attack, but Quy doubted they could catch up to the faster F-4s. Then Bay spotted an opportunity, the Phantoms began to make a climbing turn. Bay and his flight commenced to cut off the F-4s, he rolled in behind the F-4C piloted by Major John "Robbie" Robertson and his backseater Hubert Buchanan (USAF # 63–7643, 555th TFS). As he closed the range he opened fire with his cannons. The F-4 pulled hard and then eased its turn. Bay adjusted and fired again, this time observing one of the F-4's wheels flying off of its wing. Buchanan ejected and was captured as POW, while Robertson is believed to have died in the wreck of their F-4 Phantom.

September 21, 1966
On this date, Bay was flying the lead of a four-ship flight, when he was directed to a target 10 miles ahead by ground control. After a few minutes, Bay spotted two F-105s at around 10,000 to 13,000 feet. Bay banked in pursuit, knowing that F-105s normally traveled in packs of four, he looked around for the other pair.  Not able to locate the other F-105s, Bay gave his wing-man, Do Huy Hoang, permission to attack. Hoang flew wide to the left, and lined up behind the second F-105. Hoang waited for the "Thuds" to turn, but instead they rolled into a shallow bank. Bay's flight had flown into an ambush. Flying low to avoid radar behind the first F-105s were First Lieutenant Karl Richter and Captain Ralph J. Beardsley. Richter jettisoned his rocket pods and lined up behind Hoang. Richter fired his M61 Gatling gun on Hoang. The airplane rolled on its own to wings level. Hoang lit the afterburner on his MiG and tried to regain control as his jet rolled to the right. Hoang's left wing was in tatters from Richter's Gatling Gun. Hoang checked his engine instruments and thought he was going to be fine, but then the plane began to come apart. Hoang had to eject. Bay, now alone, and with his fuel becoming low, found himself dodging multiple missiles from US aircraft;however, they began to depart North Vietnam's air space. At this time, Bay spotted Vo Van and followed him back to base.

January 21, 1967
On this day at 14:45 hours, GCI directed a flight of four 923 regiment MiG-17s: Ho Van Quy, Phan Thanh Tai, Nguyen Van Bay and Vo Van Man.  Just minutes after takeoff, Nguyen Van Bay made visual contact with an incoming flight of 20 F-105s and 4 F-4 Phantoms from 10 km away. At this point in time, the U.S. Thunderchiefs and Phantom crews also made visual contact with the VPAF MiGs, and were forced to jettison their bomb loads; the F-4s attacked the MiGs first, without success Ho Van Quy quickly approached a flight of F-105 with an advantageous shooting position at only 500–600 meters from his target F-105, but failed to score a hit. However, Nguyen Van Bay was able to shoot down the F-105D piloted by Capt. W.R. Wyatt (s/n 62-4278, of the 469th TFS/388th TFW) and claiming his 6th aerial victory, however, after Capt. Wyatt was rescued, US-side claimed the Thunderchief was shot-down by AAA.

April 24, 1967
Bay, assigned as flight leader, was scrambled from Kien An airfield. His flight was to intercept a United States Navy air raid at the Haiphong docks. Bay closed in on an unsuspecting F-8 Crusader piloted by Lt. Cdr. E.J. Tucker, and shot it down. Tucker ejected but later he died in North Vietnamese captivity. The escorting F-4s then counterattacked Bay's flight. The F-4s fired several Sidewinders at Bay, but with his wing-man's warning, he was able to dodge them all. Bay was then able to maneuver himself into a good shooting position against the crew of the USN F-4B (BuNo 153000) from VF-114, USS Kitty Hawk (CVA-63) piloted by Lcdr. Charles E. Southwick along with RIO Ens. James W. Laing (call sign Linfield 210) and claimed his seventh victory, however, Lcdr. C.E. Southwick and his RIO Ens. J.W. Laing believed that they had been "shot down by AAA" according to some sources, while "running out of fuel" according to others (the North Korean squadron Doan Z claimed an "F-4 shot-down", however the only other loss from U.S. carrier aircraft that day was an A-6A Intruder (BuNo 152589) of VF-85, also from the USS Kitty Hawk, of which the U.S. claims to have been shot-down by AAA; both Lt(jg) L.I. Williams and Lt(jg) M.D. Christian became captured POWs). While both Lcdr. Southwick and Ens. Laing safely ejected out at sea and were rescued on that 24 April 1967 day, they were again shot-down on 14 May 1967, possibly by either MiG-17 ace fighter pilot Vo Van Man, or Nguyen The Hon, both of whom were also shot-down (and KIA) on this day; both U.S. pilot Lcdr. Southwick and RIO Ens. Laing became captured POWs.

April 25, 1967
Bay and his flight were able to bring down two American A-4 Skyhawks. One A-4 was shot down by Bay himself while the other was shot down by his wing-man. Bay was awarded the Hero's Medal of the Vietnamese People's Army for his outstanding skill and bravery in combat, and for his superb leadership of his flight.

April 29, 1967
In the afternoon of this day, Nguyen Van Bay was among a flight of MiG-17s flying out of Hoa Lac on a heading of 120-degrees over to Hoa Binh, where he made visual contact of F-4 Phantoms from 8 km out, and engaging them in three-minutes time from the initial visual identification; he would quickly shoot-down one of the four USAF F-4Cs from the 389th TFS, piloted by Lt. L.H. Torkleson (POW) along with his WSO G.J. Pollin (KIA); the US-side claims the loss of this Phantom due to AAA.

Early 1972
It is a common misconception that this Nguyen Van Bay was the pilot who attacked the USS Oklahoma City on April 19, 1972. Rather, it was a different Nguyen Van Bay, or Bay B, who was downed and killed in Thanh Hoa province on May 6th the same year.

In 1971 Bay B and his fellow pilot Le Xuan Di were trained in anti-ship warfare by a Cuban advisor. On April 19, 1972, the two men from the 923rd Fighter Regiment flew their MiG-17s, each armed with two 250 kg bombs, towards the open sea in what was known as the Battle of Đồng Hới  Le Xuan Di headed his aircraft for the US destroyer , whilst Nguyen Van Bay struck for the US Navy light cruiser , which had been shelling targets in Vinh City.
Bay's two bombs caused only slight damage to the Oklahoma City, as they may have been "near misses", while Di was able to score a direct hit on the destroyer Higbee's aft 5" (127 mm) gun turret with one of his two 250 kg bombs. This was the first successful air strike made by an enemy jet fighter bomber on a US Navy warship while actively engaged in combat.

The , providing escort for the damaged warship, reportedly destroyed an enemy MiG interceptor. Following the initial attack, the USS Sterett deployed her RIM-2 Terrier missiles and destroyed an SS-N-2 "Styx" surface to surface missile in mid flight. The missiles were thought to have been launched from North Vietnamese patrol boats.

Grounded
Bay's victories made headlines in North Vietnam and fame soon followed. He dined regularly with Ho Chi Minh and reportedly, was amongst his favorites. Bay was grounded sporadically, and then permanently. As is often the practice in many countries, high ranking "Aces" are often grounded during a continuing war, to utilize their attained status to inspire future generations.

After the war, Bay returned to his hometown and took on farming and gardening. He died in 2019 after a stroke.

See also
List of Vietnam War flying aces
Vietnam People's Air Force

References

Bibliography

Further reading

External links
Vietnamese Aces
Nguyen Van Bay and the Aces from the North

1936 births
2019 deaths
North Vietnamese Vietnam War flying aces
People from Đồng Tháp Province